Gunner's Mate George Butts (1838 – February 17, 1902) was an American soldier who fought in the American Civil War. Butts received the country's highest award for bravery during combat, the Medal of Honor, for his action aboard the  during the Red River Campaign on 6 May 1864. He was honored with the award on 31 December 1864.

Biography
Butts was born in Rome, New York in 1838. He enlisted into the United States Navy. He died on 17 February 1902 and his remains are interred at the Ridgelawn Cemetery in Ohio.

Medal of Honor citation

See also

List of American Civil War Medal of Honor recipients: A–F

References

1838 births
1902 deaths
People of Ohio in the American Civil War
Union Navy officers
United States Navy Medal of Honor recipients
American Civil War recipients of the Medal of Honor